Carlos Luna may refer to:
 Carlos Luna (footballer)
 Carlos Luna (volleyball)
 Carlos Luna (artist)